Waterville Robert Lafleur Airport  is a general aviation airport located two miles (3 km) southwest of the central business district (CBD) of Waterville, a city in Kennebec County, Maine, USA.

It is currently not served by any passenger airline service, though FedEx Feeder (operated by Wiggins Airways) does serve the airport daily. Scheduled passenger service was once available on Air New England and Northeast Express Regional Airlines. KWVL has 2 open runways RW 14/32 and RW 5/23.

References

External links 

Airports in Kennebec County, Maine
Buildings and structures in Waterville, Maine